Leszek Urbanowicz (born 1 June 1964) is a Polish volleyball player. He competed in the men's tournament at the 1996 Summer Olympics.

References

External links
 

1964 births
Living people
Sportspeople from Gdańsk
Polish men's volleyball players
Olympic volleyball players of Poland
Volleyball players at the 1996 Summer Olympics
AZS Olsztyn players
Olympiacos S.C. players
Legia Warsaw (volleyball) players